Branwen is a woman in Welsh mythology. The name may also refer to:

People
 Branwen Gwyn, Welsh television presenter
 Branwen Okpako (born 1969), Nigerian–born Welsh-German filmmaker

Other uses
 Branwen (film), a 1995 British Welsh-language drama
 an alternate spelling of Brangaine, the handmaid and confidante of Iseult in the Arthurian legend of Tristan and Iseult

Welsh feminine given names